Ivan and Alexandra (translit. 1952: Ivan i Aleksandra) is a 1989 Bulgarian drama film directed by Ivan Nitchev. It was entered into the 39th Berlin International Film Festival.

Cast
 Kliment Corbadziev as Ivan
 Simeon Savov as Moni
 Monika Budjonova as Aleksandra
 Bashar Rahal as Cvetan
 Tomina Lazova as Svetla
 Boris Chuchkov as Krasimir
 Ivan Trichkov as Ogi
 Maria Statoulova as Maykata na Aleksandra
 Andrei Andreyev as Bashtata na Aleksandra
 Maria Naydenova as Maykata ha Ivan
 Hristo Garbov as Bashtata na Ivan
 Mariana Krumova as Druzhinnata
 Silvia Vargova as Maykata na Krasimir
 Minka Syulemezova as Klasnata
 Svetla Angelova as Mariya
 Filip Trifonov as Ochilatiyat

References

External links

1989 films
Bulgarian drama films
1980s Bulgarian-language films
1989 drama films
Films directed by Ivan Nitchev